Leroy Clinton "Cap" Timm (June 4, 1908 – August 7, 1987) was the longest tenured college baseball coach for the Iowa State University Cyclones located in Ames, Iowa and he held that position from the 1938 season through the 1942 season and again from the 1946 season through the 1974 season, with his tenure being interrupted due to service in World War II. In his tenure, he led Iowa State to three conference titles and two College World Series appearances. Timm died on August 7, 1987. He was inducted into the Iowa State Hall of Fame in 1997. The school's ballpark, Cap Timm Field, is named in his honor.

Playing career
Timm attended high school in Arlington, Minnesota, before attending the University of Minnesota. While attending Minnesota, Timm played as both a half and quarterback on the football team, and a catcher on the baseball team.

Head coaching record

References

1908 births
1987 deaths
Iowa State Cyclones baseball coaches
Iowa State Cyclones football coaches
Iowa State Cyclones men's basketball coaches
Minnesota Golden Gophers baseball players
Minnesota Golden Gophers football players
New York University alumni
St. Cloud State University alumni